Open All Hours is a British television sitcom created and written by Roy Clarke for the BBC. It ran for 26 episodes in four series, which aired in 1976, 1981, 1982 and 1985. The programme was developed from a television pilot broadcast in Ronnie Barker's comedy anthology series Seven of One (1973). Open All Hours ranked eighth in the 2004 Britain's Best Sitcom poll. A sequel, entitled Still Open All Hours, began airing in 2013.

Premise 
The show's setting is a small grocer's shop in Balby, a suburb of Doncaster in South Yorkshire. The owner, Arkwright (Ronnie Barker), is a middle-aged miser with a stammer and a knack for selling. His nephew Granville (David Jason) is his beleaguered errand boy who blames his work schedule for his lacklustre social life.

Across the road lives nurse Gladys Emmanuel (Lynda Baron), largely occupied by her professional rounds, and her elderly mother. Arkwright longs to marry Gladys, but she resists his persistent pressures. In later episodes it is explained that the two have been engaged for many years but have been unable to wed because of the advanced age of her mother, for whom she cares at home, as well as the mutual loathing between her mother and Arkwright. Though short-tempered with her fiancé, she is concerned for his and Granville's welfare.

Episodes

Twenty-six episodes of Open All Hours, all written by Roy Clarke, were produced for the BBC. The show began airing in 1976 with the pilot episode and ended in 1985 after the fourth series. All episodes have a running time of 30 minutes.

Still Open All Hours

A sequel, entitled Still Open All Hours, was created in 2013 by original writer Roy Clarke and featuring several original cast members, including David Jason, Lynda Baron, Stephanie Cole and Maggie Ollerenshaw. On 30 January 2014, the BBC commissioned Still Open All Hours for six new episodes beginning on 26 December 2014. and, run for six series.

Open All Hours and Still Open All Hours, has run for a total of 67 episodes across ten series.

Characters

Arkwright

Albert Arkwright is a pragmatic, miserly man with old-fashioned values, whose world seems to stop at his shop door, except for his uncontrollable lust for Nurse Gladys Emmanuel, which may prompt him on occasion to wander across the road, usually with a ladder, to gain access to her bedroom window. Arkwright is a devious and mildly dishonest character, who has many crafty tricks to try to persuade a customer to leave his shop having bought at least one thing, and will avoid spending his own money at all costs. He is also very protective of his savings, keeping some in his pocket wrapped in a fine gold chain, and some in an old, battered Oxo tin that he hides under the kitchen sink. This includes, or so he claims, coins from before 1922, when they were "solid silver".

Granville

Granville is the son of Arkwright's sister. She died a single mother when Granville was very young, leaving Arkwright to bring up the boy. Arkwright's jokes imply that his sister was promiscuous; he frequently speculates that Granville's father is Hungarian, and was forbidden to marry Granville's mother because she was English. He is often referred to as a "youth" or "young lad", even though Granville is well into his adult years. (In the Pilot episode he states that he is 25 years old.)

Granville is shy and awkward, but kind. His priorities differ from those of his uncle. He always feels that life is passing him by. Occasionally, people from Granville's past come into the shop. To Granville, who is ever saddled with his shop duties and bearing his uncle's belittling, their lives seem richer and more fulfilling.

When Granville has a fling with the milkwoman (played by Barbara Flynn), his uncle is unsupportive.

Main

Production

Series development
The shop is based on a little store called L E Riddiford in Thornbury, Gloucestershire. Roy Clarke visited this small town whilst travelling and was said to have fallen in love with the shop layout and its owner, Len Riddiford.

Ronnie Barker proposed that Arkwright should have a stammer, and this was written into the character. Barker also co-created the premise of the dangerous till. In the series, the shop's antiquated till has a drawer that tends to snap shut suddenly. Even though this terrifies Granville and Arkwright, Arkwright refuses to replace the till due to the cost of a replacement, and because he believes it discourages burglars.  By the time of Still Open All Hours, it is suggested that the till is now haunted by Arkwright's ghost as it sporadically opens and closes violently at the mere suggestion of Granville spending money.

Filming locations

The exterior shots were shot on Lister Avenue in Balby, a suburb of Doncaster; South Yorkshire. The shop itself is a hairdresser's salon, which closed for a summer break during each year the series was being filmed by the BBC. The same location is used for the sequel series Still Open All Hours. The pilot episode (featured in the series Seven of One) used a shop front on the western intersection of Drayton Avenue and Manor Road in Ealing, London for exterior filming.

In the first series, Nurse Gladys lives at 34 Lister Avenue. This is changed to 32 from the second series.

The local council considered demolishing the shop used in Open All Hours. A fan created a web site to garner support for preserving it. The shop was to be auctioned in Leeds on 24 November 2008, and was expected to fetch between £120,000 and £130,000; however, all bids fell short of the reserve price.

Three years earlier, a different sort of auction commemorated the programme. The BBC donated, to the British Stammering Association, two of the false moustaches worn by Ronnie Barker in the series. The BSA auctioned the moustaches at their London conference in September 2005, shortly before Barker's death.

Theme tune

The show's theme tune is a song called "Alice, Where Art Thou?", written by Joseph Ascher. It was arranged for a brass band and performed by Max Harris, who also wrote the incidental music for the programme.

Reception
Barker noted in his autobiography It's Hello from Him that he received a letter which began "We are a family of stutterers...", that made his heart sink. However, the writer went on to praise his portrayal and added that the whole family found the character hilarious.

Merchandise

Books
Two books related to the programme have been released in the UK. One was written by Graham McCann and published by BBC Books in October 2014 and the other one, a 'novelisation' based on scripts for the first series, was written by Christine Sparks and was published by BBC Books.

 Open All Hours
This was published in February 1981 which is based on the original programme. 

 
 Still Open All Hours: The Story of a Classic Comedy 
This was published on 30 October 2014.

VHS releases
A selection of 15 episodes of the series was released on five VHS cassettes by BBC Video on 2 April 1990, 12 June 1995, 4 March 1996, 2 June 1997, and 2 March 1998. Universal Playback, under licence by BBC Worldwide, released Series 1 and 2 as a three tape boxset on 19 August 2002 and Series 3 and 4 as a three tape set boxset on 2 June 2003.

DVD releases
All four series have been released in Regions 2 and 4, both individually and in box sets.
Region 1 has released the box set but the series have not been released individually there.
In Australia, the BBC with Roadshow released "Series One: Episodes 1–3 Comedy Bites" in 2010.

Planned spin-off

In 1984, at which time no new episodes of the series had been produced for two years, a spin-off was proposed based around Lynda Baron's character, Nurse Gladys Emmanuel. Given the working title Call the Nurse, this spin-off series would have followed Nurse Gladys as she visited various eccentric and demanding patients. The characters of Arkwright and Granville were not written to appear, and Roy Clarke was keen to develop a new set of supporting characters rather than rely on those already built up for Open All Hours. A thirty-minute pilot was written but did not enter production as the BBC turned down the series; instead, Open All Hours returned for its fourth and what would be its final series the following year.

See also
 List of Open All Hours episodes
 Porridge

References

External links

 
 Open All Hours at the British Film Institute.
 .
 .
 .

1976 British television series debuts
1985 British television series endings
1970s British sitcoms
1970s British workplace comedy television series
1980s British sitcoms
1980s British workplace comedy television series
BBC television sitcoms
Doncaster
English-language television shows
Television series set in shops
Television shows set in South Yorkshire